The , , is a Belgian breed of bantam chicken. It originated in the Belgian town of Watermael-Boitsfort, from which it takes its name, which means "bearded [chicken] from Watermael". It is closely related to the Barbu d'Anvers, but is distinguished from it by its small, backswept crest of feathers. The Barbu de Boitsfort is a rumpless variation, the only difference being that it lacks the uropygium, the part of the anatomy that carries the tail.

History

The Barbu de Watermael is among the most recent of Belgian bantam breeds, but its origin is poorly documented. It was created by Antoine Dresse at the estate of La Fougères at Watermael-Boitsfort in the early years of the twentieth century, or, according to one source, in 1915. Neither Dresse nor his son ever revealed what breeds contributed to the creation of the Barbu de Watermael, though the contribution of the Barbu d'Anvers is considered certain. Dresse did say that the Polish had not been used; the cranial protuberance typical of that breed is considered a fault in the Barbu de Watermael. The birds were first shown in 1922, but did not achieve great popularity.

In number, the Barbu de Watermael is today the second bantam breed in Belgium, with a population of 764 in 2010; it was classed as "in danger" in that year.

Characteristics

The Barbu de Watermael is one of the smallest of all bantams: males weigh  and hens  It has a narrow backswept crest, a three-part beard and a unique spined rose comb. It is raised almost exclusively as an ornamental fowl. More than thirty colour varieties are recognised in Belgium. Those usually seen are black, brown red, buff Columbia, cuckoo, quail and white; the other colours are rare, and some are in the hands of only one breeder.

References

Bantam chicken breeds
Chicken breeds
Chicken breeds originating in Belgium
Watermael-Boitsfort